Skeldon may refer to:

Ned Skeldon 
Ned Skeldon Stadium
Skeldon, Guyana